The Disconnection is the second album by Carina Round.  It was released in October 2003. The album was released in the UK with a cover shot by Anoushka Fisz (wife of Dave Stewart from Eurythmics who supported her since), then released in 2004 with a different, less disturbing cover photo, on Interscope Records in the US. The album garnished comparisons to Björk, Jeff Buckley and Robert Plant.

Track listing
All songs written by Carina Round, except where noted.

 "Shoot" — 4:46
 "Into My Blood" — 3:54
 "Lacuna" — 4:14
 "Paris" — 3:41
 "Monument" — 4:40
 "Motel 74" — 4:56
 "Overcome" — 4:21
 "Sit Tight" — 6:32
 "Elegy" — 5:55 (Carina Round, Gavin Monaghan) (note, the UK version of the album has an acoustic version of this song whilst the US version has an electric version)

Personnel
Musicians
Tom Livemore — fancy electric guitars and emma's harmonium, piano, tape delay and mandolin
Carina Round — acoustic guitar, electric guitar, piano, rhodes, metal tray, mandolin and voices
Simon Jason Smith — electric bass and double bass, portamento and electric guitar
John Large — all drums, various percussion and gravel in a box, except Sit Tight, drums and percussion played by Marcus Galley

Additional Musicians
Craig Hamilton — lush backing vocals on "Motel 74"
Anna Russell — lush backing vocals on "Motel 74"
Jim Summerfield — lush backing vocals on "Motel 74"
Pippa Green — violin on "Overcome"
Charley Miles  — violin on "Overcome"
Caroline Bodimead — violin on "Overcome"
Louis Robinson — violin on "Overcome"
Ellen Brookes — viola on "Overcome"
Bruce Wilson — viola on "Overcome"
Liz Tollington — cello on "Overcome"
Clare Spencer-smith — cello on "Overcome"
Nathan Loughran — backing voice on "Sit Tight"
Matt Taylor — clarinet, horns on "Elegy"
Ray Butcher — trumpet on "Elegy"
Tom Walter — trombone on "Elegy"
Joey Walter — sax on "Elegy"

Production
Produced by Gavin Monaghan and Carina Round
Pro-Tools Engineered and Recorded by Andy Taylor
"Sit Tight" produced by Carina Round
Recorded at Magic Garden Studios except "Sit Tight"
"Sit Tight" recorded at The Church by Graham Domny and engineered by Nathan Loughran
Mixed at The Thought Ranch by Tome Livemore and Carina Round except tracks 4, 6, 8 and 9
Tracks 4, 6, 8 and 9 mixed at Eastcote Studios by Gavin Monaghan
Mastered at Loud by John Dent
String Arrangement for "Overcome" by John Cotton

Release history

References

2003 albums
Carina Round albums
Interscope Records albums